Julie Salmon (born 8 July 1965) is a British former international tennis player. She competed in the Fed Cup a number of times, from 1988 to 1993. She was the last British survivor in singles competition at Wimbledon 1988, reaching the third round.

References

External links 
Julie Salmon at australianopen.com
Thomas Bonk. Wimbledon Roundup : Graf Storms Past Salmon in the First Round, 6-1, 6-2. The Los Angeles Times. June 28, 1989. Retrieved (2011-11-15).

1965 births
Living people
British female tennis players
Place of birth missing (living people)